Ashour is a surname. Notable people with the surname include:

Ashour El Adham, Egyptian footballer
Ali Ashour, M.A., (born 1960), judge and a Libyan politician
Hisham Mohd Ashour, (born 1982), professional squash player who represents Egypt
Hossam Ashour (born 1986), Egyptian footballer
Magdy Ashour, Egyptian activist
No'man Ashour (1918–1987), Egyptian poet and playwright,
Omar Ashour, political scientist, human rights activist, and a martial arts champion from Montreal
Radwa Ashour (1946–2014), Egyptian novelist
Ramy Ashour (born 1987), professional squash player from Egypt
Said Ashour (1922–2009), professor of history in Cairo University, author of 22 books
Saleh Ashour, member of the Kuwaiti National Assembly
Ashour Bourashed, member of the Libyan National Transitional Council representing the city of Derna
Mohamed Ashour Khawaja (born 1987), Libyan sprinter, specialising in the 400 metres
Ashour Bin Khayal (born 1939), Libyan diplomat and politician
Ashour Suleiman Shuwail (born 1954), Libyan minister of interior from July 2012

See also
Ashur
Asur (disambiguation)

Arabic-language surnames